Bolbocerosoma pusillum is a species of beetle in the family Bolboceratidae. It is found in North America.

Subspecies
 Bolbocerosoma pusillum pusillum Dawson and McColloch, 1924
 Bolbocerosoma pusillum townesi Howden, 1955

References

Further reading

 Arnett, R.H. Jr., M. C. Thomas, P. E. Skelley and J. H. Frank. (eds.). (2002). American Beetles, Volume II: Polyphaga: Scarabaeoidea through Curculionoidea. CRC Press LLC, Boca Raton, FL.
 
 Richard E. White. (1983). Peterson Field Guides: Beetles. Houghton Mifflin Company.

Bolboceratidae
Beetles described in 1924